Founded in 1967 to serve destinations in Texas, Southwest Airlines was initially prevented from operating, and saw long-haul flights from its original Dallas Love Field hub restricted by federal law for several decades. Despite these obstacles, Southwest has built a history of innovative business practices, and has grown to be one of the largest airlines in the United States and one of the largest low-cost carriers worldwide.

Early history 

Southwest Airlines began with the March 15, 1967, incorporation of Air Southwest Co. by Lamar Muse,  Rollin King and Herb Kelleher to fly within the state of Texas.

Kelleher asserted that by staying within Texas, price controls and market regulations imposed by the federal Civil Aeronautics Board would not apply, and the airline could undercut competitors' prices.  Three airlines (Braniff, Trans-Texas Airways and Continental Airlines) started legal action that took three years to resolve. Air Southwest prevailed in 1970 when the Texas Supreme Court upheld Air Southwest's right to fly within Texas. The Texas decision became final on December 7, 1970, when the U.S. Supreme Court declined to review the case without comment, vindicating Kelleher's opinion on the limits of federal market regulation.

On March 29, 1971, Air Southwest Co. changed its name to Southwest Airlines Co. with headquarters in Dallas. Southwest began scheduled passenger service on June 18, 1971, on two routes:  between Dallas Love Field and Houston Intercontinental Airport (IAH) and between Dallas Love Field and San Antonio with three Boeing 737-200s. Service between Houston Hobby Airport (HOU) and Dallas Love Field and between Houston Hobby and San Antonio began on November 14, 1971.   The Official Airline Guide for October 15, 1972, lists 61 flights a week each way between Dallas Love and Houston Hobby, 23 flights a week each way between Dallas Love and San Antonio and 16 flights a week each way between San Antonio and Houston Hobby; no flights operated on Saturdays.

Southwest Airlines founder Herb Kelleher studied California-based Pacific Southwest Airlines (PSA) and used many of PSA's ideas to form the corporate culture at Southwest. Early flights used the same "Long Legs And Short Nights" theme for stewardesses on board typical Southwest Airlines flights. A committee including the same person who had selected hostesses for Hugh Hefner's Playboy jet selected the first flight attendants, females described as long-legged dancers, majorettes and cheerleaders with "unique personalities." Southwest Airlines and Herb Kelleher dressed them in hot pants and go-go boots.

The New York Times wrote in 1971 that Southwest Airlines President Lamar Muse, "says frankly—and repeatedly—that Southwest Airlines has been developed from its inception around the ideas that have proven to be successful for Pacific Southwest Airlines." "We don't mind being copycats of an operation like that," referring to a visit he and other Southwest executives made to PSA as they assembled their operating plans. PSA welcomed them and even sold them flight and operations training. Muse later wrote that creating the operations manuals for his upstart airline was "primarily a cut and paste procedure" and it is said that "Southwest Airlines copied PSA so completely that you could almost call it a photocopy."

The rest of 1971 and 1972 saw operating losses. One of the airline's four 737s was sold to Frontier Airlines to cover payroll and other expenses. Southwest continued a schedule based on four aircraft but using only three, so the "ten minute turn" was born and was the standard ground time for many years. Southwest turned a profit in fiscal year 1973 and would remain consistently profitable until 2020.

Operations from Love Field were a central tenet of Southwest's business model due to its convenient proximity to downtown Dallas. However, years of infighting between the cities of Dallas and Fort Worth over Greater Southwest International Airport (GSW) and Love Field had prompted the Civil Aeronautics Board (CAB) in 1964 to order the cities to build a new joint regional airport. The cities agreed to construct Dallas/Fort Worth International Airport (DFW), and in 1968, agreements were executed prohibiting the cities from operating competing commercial airports and obligating all existing air carriers at Love and GSW to move to the new airport. Southwest's plans to stay at Love Field ran afoul of the hard-fought agreement to close Love to certified air carriers and redevelop it for general aviation. The airline held firm, asserting that no legal basis existed to close the airport to commercial service, and that they were not bound by an agreement they did not sign. Dallas, Fort Worth, and the DFW Airport Board sued for a declaratory judgment entitling Dallas to evict Southwest from the airport under the 1964 CAB order, but Southwest argued that the CAB had no authority over flights that did not cross state borders, and in 1973, a federal district court ruled that Southwest's proposed intrastate service fell outside of CAB jurisdiction, and so long as Love Field remained open, the City of Dallas could not preclude Southwest from operating there.

Wright Amendment 
The Wright Amendment of 1979 was a federal law that governed traffic at Dallas Love Field until many restrictions from the amendment were removed in late 2014. The limits began to phase out in 1997 and 2005; in 2006, the amendment was repealed, with some restrictions intact until 2014, but added a restriction on the number of gates allowed.

The Wright Amendment grew from Southwest's refusal to relocate to DFW. After the Airline Deregulation Act was enacted in 1978, Southwest announced plans to begin interstate service in 1979 with flights to New Orleans, a proposal that was quickly endorsed by federal regulators. However, Texas officials—particularly those from Fort Worth—thought that increased traffic at Love Field could draw flights away from DFW Airport and threaten its financial stability. Consequently, Jim Wright, member of the U.S. House of Representatives serving Fort Worth, sponsored and helped pass an amendment to the International Air Transportation Act of 1979 in Congress that restricted passenger air traffic out of Love Field in the following ways: 
 Passenger service using full-size mainline airliners could be provided only to airports within Texas and its four neighboring U.S. states: Arkansas, Louisiana, New Mexico and Oklahoma.  At the time, all existing and planned Southwest routes were contained within this area, so the law had no immediate effect on the airline.
 Flights to other states were allowed only on aircraft with 56 seats or fewer, in an attempt to prohibit mainline passenger service beyond the five-state region.
 Airlines could not offer connecting flights, through service on another airline, or through ticketing beyond the five-state region.

Network expansion 

While the Wright Amendment deterred major airlines from starting (or resuming) service out of Love Field, Southwest quickly expanded its Love Field operation by undercutting the high fares charged by legacy airlines to fly to smaller, underserved airports in the five-state region.

Southwest only flew to Dallas Love Field, Houston (IAH, then HOU) and San Antonio until 1975 when it added Harlingen. In 1979 Southwest flew to eleven Texas cities and added its first route out of the state, Houston-New Orleans, on January 25 of that year. In 1980 Southwest expanded north to Tulsa and Oklahoma City and west to Albuquerque; in 1982, north to Kansas City and west to Phoenix, Las Vegas and California.

Flights to Denver started in 1983 (and ended in 1986), to Little Rock 1984, to St Louis and Chicago Midway in 1985, to Nashville in 1986 and to Detroit Metro and Birmingham in 1987. Eastward expansion resumed in 1992 with Cleveland and Columbus, then Baltimore in 1993. The Pacific Northwest started in 1994 after the Morris Air acquisition; Tampa and Fort Lauderdale started in January 1996. East to Providence in 1997, Manchester in 1998, and Islip and Raleigh-Durham in 1999.

Southwest's only route within California was San Francisco-San Diego until it started Oakland in 1989; in the next few years its capacity on the West Coast ballooned.

1980s–1990s 

Southwest hired its first black pilot, Louis Freeman, in 1980. In 1992, he was named the first black chief pilot of any major U.S. airline.

In 1981 Southwest was successfully sued for its then-existing policy of hiring only female flight attendants and ticket agents.

Southwest's Houston Pilot Base opened on June 1, 1984, its first crew base outside Dallas.

On November 30, 1984, Southwest took delivery of its first Boeing 737-300. Southwest was a launch customer and in May 2012 was the largest operator of the type. The first 737-300 was dubbed "Kitty Hawk."

In 1985, Dallas, Fort Worth, and the DFW Airport Board attempted to block Continental Airlines from Love Field on the grounds that it offered interline through-ticketing, a service prohibited under the Wright Amendment and not offered by Southwest. However, the United States Department of Transportation (USDOT) ruled that an airline was merely disallowed from through-ticketing flight segments to or from Love Field, and that selling a passenger a separate ticket on a connecting flight at another airport—a practice known as double ticketing—was perfectly legal provided that the airline was not "advertising, promoting, or otherwise affirmatively soliciting double ticketing passengers." This ruling benefited Southwest by allowing the sale of connecting tickets from Love Field provided that such tickets were requested by travelers rather than being directly solicited by the airline or its employees. Following this ruling, a sophisticated Southwest passenger could work the system and circumvent the Wright Amendment's restrictions by flying from Dallas to another airport in the five-state region, changing planes, and then flying on a separate ticket to any city Southwest served.

Southwest paid US$60.5 million in stock and cash for Muse Air when Muse was on the verge of collapse in 1985. After completing the acquisition, Southwest renamed MuseAir TranStar Airlines. TranStar became a wholly owned subsidiary of Southwest and operated as an independent airline. Unwilling to compete in a fare war against Frank Lorenzo's Texas Air, Southwest eventually sold TranStar's assets to Lorenzo in August 1987.

Southwest moved into its current headquarters in 1990. The airline had been headquartered at 3300 Love Field Dr, then in the 1820 Regal Row building in Dallas in 1979, by Love Field. At that time the headquarters had  of space and about 650 employees. The current headquarters facility was built at a cost of $15 million in 1990 dollars. In early 1995 the building received an additional  of space.  about 1,400 employees worked in the three story building.

In 1990 the airline registered its aircraft in Houston so it could pay aircraft taxes in Houston, even though corporate headquarters were in Dallas. Southwest was not relocating any assets, but Texas state law allowed the airline to choose Dallas or Houston as the city of registry of its aircraft.

Southwest acquired Morris Air, an airline based in Salt Lake City, Utah, in 1993, paying US$134 million in stock. After completing the purchase, Southwest absorbed the capital and routes of Morris Air into Southwest's inventory and service, including Morris' Pacific Northwest destinations not previously served by Southwest. One founder of Morris Air, David Neeleman, worked with Southwest for a short period before leaving to found WestJet and then JetBlue Airways, a competing airline.

On March 16, 1995, Southwest created its first website. Originally called the "Southwest Airlines Home Gate," passengers could view schedules, a route map and company information at Iflyswa.com. Southwest.com was the number one airline website for online revenue, according to PhoCusWright. Nielsen/Netratings also reported that Southwest.com was the largest airline site in terms of unique visitors. In 2006, 70 percent of flight bookings and 73 percent of revenue was generated from bookings on southwest.com. , 69 percent of Southwest passengers checked in for their flights online or at a kiosk.

Southwest Airlines gained a reputation for "outside the box thinking" and proactive risk management, including the use of fuel hedging to insulate against fuel price fluctuation. Some analysts have argued against the style of profit-motivated energy trading Southwest did between 1999 and the early 2000s. They suggested that rather than hedging business risk (such as a hedge on weather to a farmer), Southwest was simply speculating on energy prices, without a formal rationale for doing so.

Southwest has enjoyed much positive press (and a strong financial boost) from its energy trading skills. However, while most analysts agree that volatility hedges can be beneficial, speculative hedges are not widely supported as a continuing strategy for profits.

In March 1996, after the Dallas City Council unanimously voted to allow construction, the airline began to build a  addition to the existing corporate headquarters at a cost of $30 million in 1996 dollars. A $9.8 million pilot training facility was built on a  plot of land owned by the city of Dallas; it was scheduled to be completed in the Spring of 1997. The airline also leased  from the city of Dallas for more parking; 700 spaces were added to the existing 1,200. By the end of 1997 the expansion of Love Field facilities and several terminal improvements were expected to cost Southwest $47 million.

In 1997, Southwest and Icelandair entered into interline and marketing agreements allowing for joint fares, coordinated schedules, transfer of passenger luggage between the two airlines in Baltimore and a place connecting passengers between several U.S. cities and several European cities. The frequent flyer programs were not included in the agreement.

2000s

Repealing the Wright Amendment

In 1996, startup carrier Legend Airlines proposed to start long-range flights from Love Field using McDonnell Douglas DC-9s refitted with 56 seats, the maximum allowed under the Wright Amendment. However, the USDOT ruled in September 1996 that the 56-seat restriction applied to the "designed capacity" of an airliner rather than to the number of seats actually installed, prompting Legend to seek to change the law. By July 1997, Legend had enlisted the help of Senator Richard Shelby of Alabama. In October 1997, the United States Senate passed a funding bill that included the Shelby Amendment, allowing unrestricted flights to Alabama, Kansas, and Mississippi and nationwide flights using larger aircraft reconfigured with 56 seats. Southwest did not add flights to the new states, citing a lack of demand. However, other airlines were prompted to challenge Southwest at Love Field; the first was Continental Express, which began flights between Love Field and George Bush Intercontinental Airport in Houston in June 1998, and announced its intention to launch interstate flights once legal and regulatory obstacles were overcome.

On April 5, 2000, Legend Airlines inaugurated the first 56-seat long-haul service from Love Field to destinations beyond the Wright and Shelby Amendment regions. By July 2000, it had been joined by American Airlines, Continental Express and Delta Air Lines regional affiliate Atlantic Southeast Airlines. Industry observers predicted that competing airlines' regional jet service at Love Field would continue, but Southwest—which did not operate 56-seat aircraft—could not offer competing service because the Legend-backed Shelby Amendment had left the 56-seat long-haul restriction in place.

In late 2004, Southwest began actively seeking the full repeal of the Wright Amendment restrictions. In late 2005, Missouri was added to the list of permissible destination states via a transportation appropriations bill. New service from Love Field to Saint Louis, Missouri and Kansas City, Missouri quickly started in December 2005.

At a June 15, 2006, joint press conference held by the city of Dallas, the city of Fort Worth, DFW Airport, American Airlines and Southwest Airlines, the said parties announced a tentative agreement on how the Wright Amendment was to be phased out. Both the U.S. Senate and House of Representatives passed Wright-related legislation on September 29, 2006, and it was signed into law by President George W. Bush on October 13, 2006. The new law became effective on October 16, 2006, when the FAA Administrator notified Congress that any new aviation operations occurring as a result of the new law could be accommodated without adverse effect to the airspace.

Southwest started selling tickets under the new law on October 19, 2006. Highlights of the agreement are the immediate elimination of through-ticketing prohibitions and unrestricted flights to domestic destinations eight years after the legislation takes effect. Because of the agreement, nationwide service became possible for Southwest; the law also defined the maximum number of gates at Love Field. Southwest controlled all but four of the Love Field gates. United Airlines controlled two and American Airlines was initially supposed to operate from the other two, however, because of American's merger with US Airways, it had to give up the two gates at DAL. Virgin America began leasing the two gates from American on October 13, 2014.

Southwest remains the dominant passenger airline at Love Field, maintains its headquarters, hangars, training centers and flight simulators adjacent thereto and reflects its ties to Love Field in its winged heart livery and its stock exchange ticker symbol (LUV).

2000–2009

On March 5, 2000, Southwest Airlines Flight 1455, a Boeing 737-3T5, registration N668SW, carrying 137 passengers and 5 crew, overran the runway at Burbank-Glendale-Pasadena Airport, Burbank, California, skidding across a city street and coming to rest at a Chevron gas station. 2 passengers suffered serious injuries, while the captain and 41 passengers suffered minor injuries; the aircraft was badly damaged and was written off. This was the first major accident in the airline's 29-year history. The accident was attributed to pilot error, with the pilots having landed at an excessive airspeed; a contributing factor was air traffic control error.

Southwest's codeshare arrangement with Icelandair was terminated when that airline's service from Baltimore to Keflavík International Airport ended in January 2007.

In 2008, Southwest contracted with Pratt and Whitney to supply the proprietary Ecopower water pressure-washing system, which allows Southwest to clean grime and contaminants off engine turbine blades while the aircraft is parked at the gate. Frequent use of the Ecopower system is estimated to improve fuel efficiency by about 1.9%.

Southwest paid US$7.5 million to acquire certain assets from bankrupt ATA Airlines in 2008. Southwest's primary reason for making the purchase was to acquire the operating certificate and landing slots at New York's LaGuardia Airport formerly controlled by ATA. While some preferential hiring was indicated at the time of the purchase, the transaction ultimately did not include the purchase of any aircraft, facilities or transfers of employees directly from ATA. At the time of ATA's demise in April 2008, the airline offered over 70 flights a week to Hawaii from Southwest's focus cities in PHX, LAS, LAX and OAK with connections available to many other cities across the United States. The ATA/Southwest codeshare was terminated when ATA filed for Chapter 11 bankruptcy on April 3, 2008.

On March 6, 2008, Federal Aviation Administration (FAA) inspectors submitted documents to the United States Congress, alleging that Southwest allowed 117 of its aircraft to fly carrying passengers despite the fact that they were "not airworthy" according to air safety investigators. In some cases the aircraft were allowed to fly for up to 30 months after the inspection deadlines had passed, rendering them unfit to fly. Records indicate that thousands of passengers were flown on aircraft deemed unsafe by federal standards. Southwest declined comment at the time and US Representative James Oberstar advised a hearing would be held.

On March 12, 2008, Southwest Airlines voluntarily grounded 44 aircraft to check if they needed further inspection. The FAA claimed that Southwest Airlines flew almost 60,000 flights without fuselage inspections taking place. Southwest Airlines faced a $10.2 million fine if found to have violated FAA regulations. There have also been rumors that the FAA knew about Southwest Airlines' violations but decided not to fine the airline because it would disrupt the airline's services. On March 2, 2009, Southwest settled these claims, agreeing to pay the FAA fines of $7.5 million for these safety and maintenance issues. The original fine of $30.2 million – a sum that would have been the largest fine in the agency's history – was lowered after a year of negotiations. The FAA gave Southwest two years in which to pay the fine.

On July 8, 2008, Southwest Airlines signed a codeshare agreement with WestJet of Canada, giving the two airlines the ability to sell seats on each other's flights. Originally, the partnership was to be finalized by late 2009, but had been postponed due to economic conditions. On April 16, 2010, Southwest and WestJet airlines amicably agreed to terminate the implementation of a codeshare agreement between the two airlines.

On July 30, 2009, Southwest Airlines made a $113.6 million bid for bankrupt Frontier Airlines Holdings, the parent company of Frontier Airlines. Southwest planned to initially operate Frontier as a stand-alone carrier, eventually absorbing the airline and replacing Frontier's aircraft with Boeing 737s. Less than one month after submitting its bid, Southwest learned on August 14 that it had lost the initial bidding to Republic Airways Holdings and elected not to counter or pursue the deal further. Southwest stated that its requirement for pilots' unions at both companies to reach a negotiated (not arbitrated) agreement as a condition of acquisition was a key factor in its abandonment of its bid.

Southwest signed its second international codeshare agreement on November 10, 2008, with Mexican low-cost carrier Volaris. The agreement allowed Southwest to sell tickets on Volaris flights.

On August 26, 2009, the FAA investigated Southwest for installing improper parts on about 10% of its jets. The work was performed by an outside maintenance company. The FAA stated that the parts do not present a safety danger, but the airline was given until December 24, 2009, to replace the parts with those approved by the FAA.

2010s

AirTran Airways acquisition 

Southwest Airlines first announced the acquisition on September 27, 2010, and received final approval from the United States Department of Justice on April 27, 2011. On May 2, 2011, Southwest Airlines completed the acquisition of AirTran Airways by purchasing all of the outstanding common stock, corporate identity and operating assets of AirTran Holdings, Inc., the former parent company of AirTran Airways. Southwest Airlines estimates the transaction's value at $3.2 billion and expects onetime costs to integrate the two airlines of $500 million, with cost synergies of approximately $400 million annually. The greatest impact on Southwest, access to Atlanta, international service and the addition of landing slots at New York-LaGuardia Airport and Washington-Reagan Airport. Southwest obtained a single operating certificate (SOC) from the United States Federal Aviation Administration on March 1, 2012, but the airline was not fully integrated until AirTran had its last flight on December 28, 2014.

An entity called Guadeloupe Holdings was formed by Southwest to act as a wholly owned subsidiary of Southwest Airlines and holding company for AirTran's operations and assets. Southwest's organized labor groups ceded contractual "scope" provisions pending acceptable negotiated seniority integration agreements. Southwest transitioned aircraft, routes and employees from AirTran to Southwest on a one-by-one basis until all parts of AirTran were integrated to Southwest.

The purchase added 25 additional destinations previously not served by Southwest including cities in the Caribbean and Atlanta, Georgia, an AirTran hub and at the time, the largest U.S. city not served by Southwest. On October 10, 2011, USA Today reported that Southwest would work to no longer bank flights in Atlanta as AirTran did.

On February 14, 2013, Southwest began codesharing with AirTran. It took the first step on January 26, 2013, by launching shared itineraries in five markets. Southwest continued to launch shared itineraries with 39 more markets beginning February 25, 2013. In April 2013, shared itineraries were expanded to all Southwest and AirTran cities (domestic and international). The airlines were fully integrated on December 29, 2014.

2010–2019 

For the tenth year in a row, Fortune magazine recognized Southwest Airlines in its annual survey of corporate reputations. Among all industries in 2004, Fortune has listed Southwest Airlines as number three among America's Top Ten most admired corporations.

On December 13, 2011, Southwest placed a firm order for 150 Boeing 737 MAX aircraft, becoming the launch customer for the type. The first 737 MAX Aircraft was delivered to Southwest on August 29, 2017, with their first revenue service began on October 1.

In January 2012, Southwest Airlines expressed interest in serving Mexican- and South American destinations out of Houston's William P. Hobby Airport. On May 30, 2012, Houston's city council approved Southwest's request for international flights from Hobby. Southwest agreed to invest at least $100 million to cover all costs tied to the Hobby upgrade, which included designing and building five new gates and a customs facility. Construction at Hobby took two years, with international flights beginning in October 2015.

On April 11, 2012, Southwest introduced the 737-800 to the fleet. It seats 175 passengers as compared to the regular 143-seater 737-700. The first 737-800 was called "Warrior One" in salute of the Southwest Employees’ Warrior Spirit.

On February 22, 2013, the connecting agreement with Volaris was terminated. It was said to be mutual between the airlines. Most industry experts believe that the expansion of the subsidiary of Southwest, AirTran Airways, into more Mexican markets, was a main reason for the termination of the agreement.

On May 5, 2014, Southwest announced that it had chosen Amadeus IT Group to replace its current domestic reservation system. Southwest already operated its international reservation system with Amadeus. The new domestic reservation system was expected to take a few years to be fully implemented. When completed, Southwest will operate one reservation system by Amadeus.

In September 2014, Southwest introduced new branding, including a new livery and logo.

On October 13, 2014, the Wright Amendment restrictions at Dallas Love Field were repealed and Southwest expanded service at Love Field to include cities outside the previous location restrictions.

Throughout 2014, Southwest expanded service at Reagan-National in Washington D.C. and LaGuardia Airport in New York City through slot acquisitions from the American Airlines/US Airways merger.

On June 10, 2016, Southwest received approval to begin flights to Cuba. Southwest was one of six airlines chosen by the USDOT to commence scheduled service to Cuba. Southwest launched service from Fort Lauderdale–Hollywood International Airport to Varadero, Cuba and Santa Clara, Cuba.

In July 2016, an operational outage caused by technology problems cancelled hundreds of Southwest flights, stranding tens of thousands of passengers and many aircrew.

On April 17, 2018, Southwest Airlines Flight 1380, one person was killed after an engine failure on a Southwest Airlines flight from New York to Dallas. The engine exploded on the Boeing 737-700 and sent shrapnel flying back towards the passenger window, breaking it. The passenger was partially sucked out through the broken window as an uncontrolled decompression ensued. While other passengers managed to pull the passenger out of the window, she ultimately died from her injuries. This death was the first in-flight fatality due to an accident in the history of Southwest.

On March 13, 2019, the FAA grounded all 737 MAX aircraft following the discovery of evidence suggesting a common cause for the crashes of Lion Air Flight 610 on October 29, 2018, and Ethiopian Airlines Flight 302 on March 10, 2019. The 737 MAX 8 constituted about 5 percent of the Southwest fleet at the time, and the airline offered to rebook travelers' previously scheduled MAX 8 flights on other aircraft without charging additional fees or fare differences. On October 17, 2019, the airline stated that it was expecting the MAX 8 to remain grounded until at least February 8, 2020, forcing the preemptive cancellation of roughly 175 flights per weekday.

In June 2019, Captain Bryan Knight flew his dad, Colonel Roy A. Knight, home to Dallas Love Field. 52 years ago, Colonel Knight left Love Field to serve in the Vietnam War, but four months later, he was shot down over Laos. At the time when his son said goodbye to him, he was five years old. His body was recovered, and was flown from Laos to California. There, Southwest flight 1220, bound for Dallas, Texas, brought him home. When Colonel Knight arrived, he was given full military honors.

2020s

2020–present

In January 2020, the Wall Street Journal reported the United States Department of Transportation was working on an investigation that found Southwest flew more than 17 million passengers on planes with unconfirmed maintenance records over two years and that the FAA had allowed Southwest to fly aircraft with unresolved safety concerns.

In March 2020, the COVID-19 pandemic had a severe impact on Southwest operations, as a 92% drop in United States air travel compared to March 2019 prompted the airline to cancel 1,500 daily flights constituting about 40% of its schedule. In March 2020, Southwest Airlines had stored 50 737-700 aircraft at Southern California Logistics Airport, adding to the 34 grounded 737 MAX jets already in storage. By April 7, it became clear that summer travel was being adversely affected, and the airline suspended close to 50% of it flight schedule through June 27. On April 14, Southwest finalized a deal to receive congressional relief funding consisting of $2.3 billion in grants and a $1 billion low-interest loan.

In April 2020, Southwest suspended relatively fewer flights than other major airlines, becoming the world's largest airline measured by operational seat capacity. By April 28, Southwest had parked 350 of its 742 aircraft, negotiated the delay of many anticipated Boeing 737 MAX deliveries, and was reporting daily losses of at least $30 million.

In July 2020, around one-third of Southwest's employees had expressed interest taking early retirement or long-term leave, and the company launched voluntary separation and extended time off initiatives; over 16,800 employees signed up for the programs. On October 5, 2020, chief executive officer (CEO) Gary C. Kelly announced pay cuts for non-union employees and senior management starting in 2021 to avert furloughs, and stated that Southwest would negotiate with its pilot and flight attendant unions for similar cuts, although the unions expressed opposition. On November 6, 2020, citing ongoing pandemic-related losses and stalled negotiations with the unions, Southwest issued WARN Act notices to 42 employees—the first time in company history that the airline had formally threatened to furlough an employee. On November 18, another 402 WARN notices were issued to mechanics. However, the Consolidated Appropriations Act, 2021 was enacted on December 27, 2020, providing $15 billion in airline aid, and Southwest rescinded the furlough notices and pay cuts.

Amid the upheaval in the airline industry due to the coronavirus, Southwest sought to challenge the larger airlines by expanding into their hub airports and increasing service to vacation-oriented destinations in 2021. Southwest announced it would expand its footholds in the Houston and Chicago markets, supplementing its hubs at Hobby and Midway with service to Bush Airport in Houston (a United hub) and O'Hare Airport in Chicago (a hub for United and American Airlines). The return to Bush is the first time Southwest has served the airport since it pulled out in 2005, and the entry into O'Hare is the first time it has ever served the larger Chicago airport. Southwest also began service at Miami International Airport, an American Airlines hub. It also announced service to three Colorado ski cities and several southern destinations for a total of ten new destinations in 2021.

In October 2020, Southwest announced that it was considering the Airbus A220 as an alternative to the MAX 7 to replace its 737-700s, with deliveries from 2025. However, in March 2021 Southwest announced an order for 100 MAX 7 jets with deliveries from 2022 and said that negotiations with Airbus were never initiated.

In November 2020, the FAA formally ended the 737 MAX grounding, and Southwest began the process of returning its 34 737 MAX aircraft to service and retraining all of its pilots. On March 11, 2021, Southwest resumed 737 MAX operation, becoming the fourth US airline to do so.

Southwest posted a $3.1 billion loss for fiscal year 2020, the first time the airline had not turned an annual profit since 1972.

On June 23, 2021, Gary Kelly announced he would relinquish his role as CEO in February 2022, with Bob Jordan announced to take his place at that time. Kelly will remain as Executive Chairman of the board until at least 2026.

On December 26, 2022, the airline has cancelled around 70% of their scheduled flights, with the blame being put on the Late December 2022 North American winter storm. Although the weather eased, further flights were cancelled on the following days. Some impacted passengers were unable to contact the airline and were left stranded without their luggage, prompting a response from the United States Department of Transportation. On December 28, the airline cancelled more flights for an extended period as a result of damage to its operational systems.

Citations

References

External links
 How I Built This podcast – Southwest Airlines: Herb Kelleher (audio interview)

Southwest Airlines
Southwest Airlines
Southwest Airlines
Aviation history of the United States